George Henry Bennett (1875 – 1946) was a Roman Catholic clergyman who served as the Bishop of Aberdeen from 1918 to 1946.

Born in St. John's on the island of Antigua in the Caribbean Sea on 24 June 1875, he was ordained a priest on 9 April 1898. He was appointed the Bishop of the Diocese of Aberdeen by the Holy See on 18 June 1918, and consecrated to the Episcopate on 1 August 1918. The principal consecrator was Archbishop John Aloysius Maguire of Glasgow, and the principal co-consecrators were Bishop John Toner of Dunkeld and Bishop James William McCarthy of Galloway.

He died in office on 25 December 1946, aged 71.

References 

Bishops of Aberdeen
20th-century Roman Catholic bishops in Scotland
Antigua and Barbuda clergy
Antigua and Barbuda emigrants to the United Kingdom
People from St. John's, Antigua and Barbuda
1875 births
1946 deaths